Heyn is a surname. Notable people with the surname include:

Adolfo Jara Heyn (born 1964), Paraguayan footballer and manager
Bertram Heyn (1912–1998), Sri Lankan Burgher general and cricketer
Clara Heyn (1924–1998), Israeli botanist
David Heyn (born 1945), Sri Lankan cricketer
Emil Heyn (1867–1922), German metallurgist
Luis Jara Heyn (born 1964), Paraguayan footballer

See also
Heyns